Francesco Del Grosso (28 September 1899 – 22 July 1938) was an Italian cyclist. He competed in two events at the 1924 Summer Olympics. He was killed fighting for the Nationalist faction during the Spanish Civil War.

References

External links
 

1899 births
1938 deaths
Italian male cyclists
Olympic cyclists of Italy
Cyclists at the 1924 Summer Olympics
Sportspeople from Parma
Italian military personnel of the Spanish Civil War
Military personnel killed in the Spanish Civil War
Cyclists from Emilia-Romagna
Olympians killed in warfare